Yvette Young is an American musician from San Jose, California. She is the front-woman for the math rock band Covet.

History
Young is of Chinese heritage and comes from a musical family:  her father Phil is a singer, accordionist, and composer, and her mother is an organist and accordionist.  She began taking piano lessons at the age of four, and violin lessons at the age of seven. She graduated from University of California, Los Angeles with a Bachelor of Fine Arts and began her career by posting videos of herself playing music in 2009. In 2014, Young released an EP titled Acoustics EP and further expanded her discography with the release of a split EP with Natalie Evans in 2015. In June 2017, Young released a second EP entitled Acoustics EP 2.

Young used her background in piano to use polyphony on a guitar. She taught herself guitar by ear after being hospitalized for an eating disorder. She notes, "I write with my ear, so I’m not really in a box in terms of chord shapes. And I don’t use [traditional] shapes at all, which freaks a lot of people out! I have a million different tunings I work in too so I didn’t really put in the time to learn every shape in every tuning, that would be ridiculous." She uses a technique of singing the part out loud and then replicating it on guitar to decipher the parts of the songs she writes.

Young also creates unique illustration and art pieces, including work on some of her own guitars. One of her paintings serves as the cover for her band's album Technicolor, released in June 2020. She has also painted Willow Smith's guitar.

Young has begun to teach a master course on guitar and finds that her style resonates with many of her students. Before this she was mainly an art teacher, but by teaching while on tour she has become a music teacher.

Young was featured in a Super Bowl LV Commercial in February 2021 for Logitech. She is also featured on their website as a partner with tutorials and tips on how to use their equipment.

Young was featured on Chunk! No, Captain Chunk!'s new album Gone Are The Good Days on the track, "Tongue Tied".

Gear
As of 2019, Young plays two Ibanez Talman Prestige guitars with Seymour Duncan Five-Two single-coil pickups and custom sparkle finishes, and a 7-string, fanned-fret Strandberg that she has painted. During NAMM 2020, Ibanez announced her signature model, the YY10, a Strat-style Talman. It was released in late 2021, and she calls it the YY20 OCS (orange-cream sparkle).  She also plays a Yamaha A5R acoustic-electric guitar.

Young plays through Vox AC amps. Her touring amp is an AC30.

Discography

Solo discography

Extended plays

 Acoustics EP (2014)
 Yvette Young/Natalie Evans Split (2015)
 Acoustics EP 2 (2017)
 Piano EP (2019)

Singles

 Rivulets (2018)
 Cars and Girls (2020)
 Sprout (2020)
 Simple and Clean (2021)

Covet discography 

Albums

 Effloresce (2018)
 Technicolor (2020)

Extended plays

 Currents (2015)
 Covet on Audiotree Live' (2016)
 Acoustics'' (2019)

References

External links
Yvette Young's Channel on YouTube

Musicians from San Jose, California
Living people
University of California, Los Angeles alumni
American women musicians of Chinese descent
21st-century American women guitarists
21st-century American guitarists
Math rock musicians
American rock guitarists
Year of birth missing (living people)